Lush Life is an American sitcom that aired in September 1996 on Fox. The series stars Karyn Parsons and Lori Petty as roommates who shared a studio apartment for financial reasons.

Plot
Petty stars as Georgette "George" Sanders, a bohemian artist who was wild and uninhibited. Parsons played Margot Hines, a snooty, airheaded wanna-be businesswoman. The two would get into conflicts generally surrounding one of their crazy schemes. In one aired episode, George fakes her own death to draw attention and higher prices to her paintings. In another, Margot convinces some of George's gay male friends to pose as her boyfriend and frighten off her ex-husband.

Cast

Main cast
Karyn Parsons as Margot Hines
Lori Petty as Georgette "George" Sanders
Fab Filippo as Hamilton Ford Foster
Khalil Kain as Lance Battista
John Ortiz as Nelson "Margarita" Marquez
Sullivan Walker as Hal Gardner

Recurring cast
Concetta Tomei as Ann Hines-Davis-Wilson-Jefferson-Ali
Derek Chen as Joey White

Episodes

References

External links
 

1996 American television series debuts
1996 American television series endings
1990s American sitcoms
English-language television shows
Fox Broadcasting Company original programming
Television series by Warner Bros. Television Studios
Television shows set in Los Angeles